Darantasia orbonella is a moth of the subfamily Arctiinae. It was described by George Hampson in 1900. It is found in New Guinea.

References

External links
 

Lithosiina
Moths described in 1900